Malcolm Partridge Butler (6 August 1913 – December 1987) was a Northern Irish professional footballer who played as a full back in The Football League for Blackpool and Accrington Stanley. He also won one cap for Ireland.

Club career
Belfast-born Butler left Belfast Celtic to sign for Blackpool in January 1935. His four-year career with the club was ended by the outbreak of the Second World War.

During the war he guested for both Chelsea and Brighton, playing around his time as a Flight-Lieutenant navigator in the Royal Air Force.

In July 1947 he signed with Accrington Stanley, and captained the club to a sixth-place finish in the Football League Third Division North before retiring in May 1948.

International career
On 15 March 1939, he played for Ireland in their 3–1 defeat to Wales. It was the country's last match before World War II.

Post-retirement
After leaving the game he became a licensee in Blackpool.

References

1913 births
1987 deaths
Association footballers from Belfast
Association football defenders
Association footballers from Northern Ireland
Belfast Celtic F.C. players
Blackpool F.C. players
Accrington Stanley F.C. (1891) players
English Football League players
Royal Air Force personnel of World War II
Chelsea F.C. wartime guest players
Brighton & Hove Albion F.C. wartime guest players
Pre-1950 IFA international footballers
Royal Air Force officers